Henry Mollicone (March 20, 1946 – May 12, 2022) was an American composer and musical instructor. He died on May 12, 2022, following a lengthy illness. At the time of his death, his home was in Saratoga, California.

The Washington Post called him "one of the most distinctive American opera composers".

Career
Mollicone is known for his one-act operas, including Emperor Norton, Starbird, and The Mask of Evil. One of his most popular works is the one-act chamber opera The Face on the Barroom Floor. Originally commissioned in 1978 for the Central City Opera of Central City, Colorado, The Face on the Barroom Floor was inspired by the painting of the same title on the floor of the Teller House Bar in Central City. Mollicone also composed three full-length operas: Coyote Tales, Hotel Eden, and Gabriel's Daughter. In addition, he wrote works for both television and film including The Premonition (1976), as well as pieces for voice, ballet, chorus and other various chamber combinations.

Other works
As a former faculty member of the Santa Clara University Department of Music, Henry Mollicone also acted as an instructor, adjudicator and collaborator. His greatest musical influences were Puccini, Verdi, Britten, and Bernstein.

References

External links
 Official website

1946 births
2022 deaths
American male classical composers
American classical composers
American opera composers
Male opera composers
Santa Clara University faculty
People from Saratoga, California
20th-century American composers
20th-century American conductors (music)
21st-century American composers
21st-century American conductors (music)
20th-century American male musicians
21st-century American male musicians
Classical musicians from California